Qaaqaaiyet El Snoubar (also spelled Qaaqaiet es Snaoubar, Kakaiyat Sanawbar, or Kaakayat Al Sanawbar) is a village in Sidon District, South Governorate, Lebanon. It is located southeast of Sidon, and is considered an "extension" of the villages of Jabal Amel. The population is of about 3,000 inhabitants.

Name 
Qaaqaaiyet derives from Muhammad bin Hassan Al-Qaiq, while El Snoubar is Arabic for "the pine", a common tree in the village, which is harvested for its pine nuts.

People 
The village contains the locally revered tomb of Sheikh Muhammad bin Hassan Al-Qa’iq.

Abbas Assi, a Lebanese international footballer, was born in Qaaqaaiyet El Snoubar.

References

Populated places in Sidon District
Shia Muslim communities in Lebanon